A company store is a retail store selling a limited range of food, clothing and daily necessities to employees of a company. It is typical of a company town in a remote area where virtually everyone is employed by one firm, such as a coal mine. In a company town, the housing is owned by the company but there may be independent stores there or nearby.

A company store may also refer to a company's merchandise store, in which fans of a company or brand may purchase clothing and collectibles related to that brand.

Employee-only company stores often accept scrip or non-cash vouchers issued by the company in advance of periodic cash paychecks, and gives credit to employees before payday.  Except in very remote areas, company stores in mining towns became scarcer after the miners bought automobiles and could travel to a range of stores.  Even so, the stores could survive because they provided convenience and easy credit. Company stores served numerous additional functions, as well, such as a locus for the government post office, and as the cultural and community center where people could freely gather.

Company stores were monopolistic institutions, funneling workers' incomes back to the owners of the company. This is because company stores often faced little or no competition for workers' earnings on account of their geographical remoteness, the inability and/or unwillingness of other nearby merchants (if any existed) to accept company scrip, or both. Prices, therefore, were typically high. Allowing purchases on credit enforced a kind of debt slavery, obligating employees to remain with the company until the debt was cleared.

Regarding this reputation, economic historian Price V. Fishback wrote:
The company store is one of the most reviled and misunderstood of economic institutions. In song, folktale, and union rhetoric the company store was often cast as a villain, a collector of souls through perpetual debt peonage. Nicknames, like the "pluck me" and more obscene versions that cannot appear in a family newspaper, seem to point to exploitation. The attitudes carry over into the scholarly literature, which emphasizes that the company store was a monopoly.
The songs Fishback mentions include the popular song "Sixteen Tons", which contains such lines as "Saint Peter, don't you call me, 'cuz I can't go. I owe my soul to the company store."

Company stores existed elsewhere than the United States, in particular in the early 1900s in Mexico, where textile workers at the largest cotton mill were paid in scrip. In a 1907 labor strike, workers attacked and looted the Río Blanco, Veracruz textile company's store. The workers were gunned down by the Mexican military, but in the aftermath of the violence, more retail outlets were opened in Rio Blanco.

Possibly the first company store in the world was in Hawaii. William Hooper started Hawaiiʻs first sugar plantation in 1835 at Koloa, on the island of Kauai. He hired 23 Hawaiian locals and paid them in a cardboard scrip, notated in various amounts. The scrip could only be exchanged for merchandise at his store. (Pau Hana- Plantation Life and Labor in Hawaii- 1835-1920- by Ronald Takaki, Univ of Hawaii Press, 1983, pg 7)

See also
 Clawback
 General store
 History of coal miners
 Truck system
 Company scrip

References
Notes

Further reading

 Excerpt and text search]
 
  the store--and the whole town, were owned by the Texas and Pacific Coal Company
 - guide to state studies of company stores in the 1880s

Working conditions
Payment systems
Retail formats
Store